The 2020–21 season is Kilmarnock's eighth season in the Scottish Premiership, and their 28th consecutive season in the top flight of Scottish football. Kilmarnock also competed in the Scottish League Cup and the Scottish Cup.

Overview
Kilmarnock began the 2020–21 season under the management of Alex Dyer who signed a two-year contract in June 2020, following his spell in temporary charge.

In the League Cup, Kilmarnock were drawn in Group E alongside Clyde, Dumbarton, Dunfermline Athletic and Falkirk. The competition is scheduled to start in October 2020.

Results and fixtures

Pre-season

Scottish Premiership

Notes

Premiership play-off final

Scottish Cup

Scottish League Cup

Group stage

Notes

Club statistics

Competition Overview

League table

League Cup table

Squad statistics

Source:

Transfers

Transfers in

Transfers out

References

Kilmarnock F.C. seasons
Kilmarnock